Medicare may refer to several publicly funded health insurance programs:

Medicare (Australia),  the publicly funded universal health care insurance scheme in Australia
Medicare card (Australia), a single plastic identity card used to identify individuals both inside and outside of the Medicare scheme
Medicare (Canada), an unofficial designation of health care system of Canada
Medicare (United States), a federal health insurance program in the United States for older people and people with certain disabilities and diseases

See also 
Medibank, Australian private health insurance provider
Medicaid
Medicare Resources, Hong Kong
Medicare Rights Center, United States